Walter Harrison may refer to:

 Walter Harrison (politician), British politician
 Walter Harrison (university administrator), President of the University of Hartford
 Walter Harrison (footballer), English footballer